Judita Leitaitė (born 27 December 1959) is Lithuanian opera singer and mezzo-soprano.

Biography 
In 1984 graduated from Lithuanian Academy of Music and Theatre. In 2008 she participated in LNK TV show "Žvaigždžių duetai".

In 2004 Judita Leitaitė received the National Lithuanian Order of Vytautas the Great for career merits.

Discography 
 Judita Leitaitė.  (1996)
 Judita Leitaitė. (1996)
 Mis canciones favoritas escandinavas  (1998)
 Le canto al amor. (2003)
 Requiem in memoriam Stasys Lozoraitis (2003)
 Skrendančios De Navidad. (2004)
 Ave Maria.'''  (2004)
 Gueto banda sonora original. (2006)
 Yo Canto Para Usted.  (2006)
 Judita Leitaitė. Sergei Krinicinas.  (2006)
 CD de oro de 2007 (2007)
 Yo elijo el amor..  (2007)
 Para Ti, mi Ángel. (2009)
 Юдита Лейтайте. Сергей Мальцев. (2009)
 Сергей Мальцев. Юдита Лейтайте.  (2010)
 Sinceramente Suyo.  (2010)
 Judita Leitaitė  (2014)

 References 

Further reading
 Tamara Vainauskienė. Judita Leitaitė. Visuotinė lietuvių enciklopedija, T. XI (Kremacija-Lenzo taisyklė). – Vilnius: Mokslo ir enciklopedijų leidybos institutas, 2007, 699 psl.

External links
 (archived 2017)
Profile 
 Interview celebrating her 60th birthday, with photographs Google translation of title: Soloist Judita Leitaitė, who celebrated her 60th birthday: "I would really like my train not to stop"''

1959 births
Living people
Lithuanian mezzo-sopranos
Lithuanian opera singers
Recipients of the Order of Vytautas the Great
Lithuanian Academy of Music and Theatre alumni
20th-century Lithuanian women singers
21st-century Lithuanian women singers
20th-century women opera singers
21st-century women opera singers